James Leroy Faulkner  (July 27, 1899 in Beatrice, Nebraska – June 1, 1962 in West Palm Beach, Florida) was a pitcher in Major League Baseball. He pitched from 1927 to 1930.

External links

1899 births
1962 deaths
Baseball players from Nebraska
People from Beatrice, Nebraska
Major League Baseball pitchers
Brooklyn Robins players
New York Giants (NL) players
Evansville Evas players
Jersey City Skeeters players
Toronto Maple Leafs (International League) players
Buffalo Bisons (minor league) players
Newark Bears (IL) players